The principal tributaries of the Colorado River  of North America are the Gila River, the San Juan River, the Green River, and the Gunnison River.

Tributary tree
The following is a tree demonstrating the points at which the major and minor tributaries of the Colorado River branch off from the main river and from each other.
(Source-upstream)
Fraser River
Muddy Creek
Blue River
Snake River
Tenmile Creek
Piney River
Eagle River
Gore Creek
Roaring Fork River
Fryingpan River
Crystal River
Plateau Creek
Gunnison River
East River
Slate River
Taylor River
Tomichi Creek
Cochetopa Creek
Quartz Creek
Lake Fork Gunnison River
Henson Creek
Uncompahgre River
Smith Fork
North Fork Gunnison River
Little Dolores River
Dolores River
West Dolores River
San Miguel River
Green River
Big Sandy River
Blacks Fork
Henry's Fork
Sheep Creek 
Carter Creek
Cart Creek
Crouse Creek
Vermillion Creek
Yampa River
Bear River
Elk River
Little Snake River
Jones Hole Creek
Duchesne River
White River
Willow River
Price River
White River
Range Creek
San Rafael River
Dark Canyon
Dirty Devil River
Muddy Creek
Fremont River
Escalante River
San Juan River
East Fork San Juan River
West Fork San Juan River
Wolf Creek
Navajo River
Piedra River
Los Pinos River
Animas River
Florida River
La Plata River
Chaco River
Mancos River
Chinle Creek
Paria River
Little Colorado River
Zuni River
Rio Nutria, tributary to the Zuni River
Rio Pescado, tributary to the Zuni River
Puerco River
Bright Angel Creek
Crystal Creek (Arizona)
Tapeats Creek
Thunder River
Deer Creek
Kanab Creek
Havasu Creek
Diamond Creek
Virgin River
Meadow Valley Wash
Muddy River
Las Vegas Wash
Bill Williams River
Santa Maria River
Big Sandy River
Gila River
San Francisco River
Tularosa River
San Pedro River
Santa Cruz River
Salt River
Black River
Tonto Creek
Verde River
Oak Creek
Agua Fria River
Hassayampa River
Hardy River
Gulf of California-(Sea of Cortez)

See also
Grand Canyon Rapids and Features

References
River and Tributary Locations determined by examining maps available at USGS national atlas 

Colorado River
 
Colorado
Colorado